The TCU Horned Frogs college football team represents Texas Christian University (TCU) in the Big 12 Conference (Big 12). The Horned Frogs compete as part of the NCAA Division I Football Bowl Subdivision. The program has had 31 head coaches, and one interim head coach, since it began play during the 1896 season. Since November 2021, Sonny Dykes has served as head coach at TCU.

Eight coaches have led TCU in postseason bowl games: William L. Driver, Dutch Meyer, Abe Martin, Jim Wacker, Pat Sullivan, Dennis Franchione, Gary Patterson, and Dykes. Seven of those coaches also won conference championships: Driver captured one as a member of the Texas Intercollegiate Athletic Association; Francis Schmidt captured two, Meyer three, Martin three, and Sullivan one as a member of the Southwest Conference; Franchione captured two as a member of the Western Athletic Conference; Patterson captured one as a member of Conference USA, four as a member of the Mountain West Conference, and one as a member of the Big 12 Conference.

Patterson is the leader in seasons coached with 21 years as head coach and games won with 181. Willis T. Stewart has the highest winning percentage at 0.889. Jim Shofner has the lowest winning percentage of those who have coached more than one game, with 0.061. Of the 31 different head coaches who have led the Horned Frogs, Matty Bell, Schmidt, Meyer, and Sullivan have been inducted into the College Football Hall of Fame.

Key

Coaches

Notes

References

TCU

TCU Horned Frogs football